Nguyễn Văn Tý (Nghệ An, 15 March 1925 – 26 December 2019) was a Vietnamese composer. He was a recipient of the Hồ Chí Minh Prize in 2000.

References 

People from Nghệ An province
Vietnamese composers
1925 births
2019 deaths
Ho Chi Minh Prize recipients
Male composers
20th-century composers
21st-century composers
20th-century male musicians
21st-century male musicians